Abel Carlos da Silva Braga (born 1 September 1952), known as Abel Braga, is a Brazilian former football coach and player.

He played as a central defender during a professional career that started with Fluminense in 1968. He earned one cap for Brazil, and was on the 1978 FIFA World Cup squad.

Since his retirement in 1985, he has managed a number of clubs in Brazil and Portugal, including three spells at Fluminense. In 2006, he won the Copa Libertadores and FIFA Club World Cup for Internacional. He has also managed French club Marseille, as well as Emirati club Al Jazira over two spells.

Playing career
Known as Abel during his playing days, he started his career as a player in Fluminense in 1968, staying at the club until 1976, when he moved to Vasco da Gama.

He also played for Paris Saint-Germain, of France, from 1979 to 1981, for Botafogo, from 1982 to 1984, and Goytacaz, in 1984, and 1985, where ended his career.

He earned just one cap for the Brazil national football team, on 19 April 1978, versus England, but he took part in the team that represented Brazil in the 1978 FIFA World Cup in Argentina.

Managerial career
After retiring as a player, Braga became a head coach, and worked at clubs such as Vasco da Gama, Internacional, Atlético Paranaense, Coritiba, Atlético Mineiro and Ponte Preta.

In 1988, at Internacional, he was runner-up of the Campeonato Brasileiro Série A after losing to Esporte Clube Bahia in the final match. In 1989, he came close to winning the Copa Libertadores, but the club ended up losing to Paraguay's Olimpia on penalties after conceding three goals in the return match at home.

In July 2000, Braga signed for Olympique de Marseille – rivals of his former team PSG – who had only just stayed in Ligue 1 on the last day of the previous season. He spent large amounts of money to buy compatriots Marcelinho Paraíba and Adriano Gabiru, and was dismissed in November with the team in the relegation zone having won five out of 16 games.

In 2004, Abel Braga became Flamengo head coach, winning Taça Guanabara and Campeonato Carioca. He became most remembered, however, because Flamengo lost the Copa do Brasil to underdogs Esporte Clube Santo André, even though the final match was held in Rio de Janeiro, home of Flamengo.

In 2005, as Fluminense head coach, he won the Campeonato Carioca of that year.
Abel finished the year, however, carrying the burden of two successive last-minute failures. Against all odds, Fluminense lost to underdogs Paulista of Jundiaí in the Copa do Brasil final match, under circumstances similar to the ones he faced the year before with Flamengo. Paulista, currently in the second division of the Campeonato Brasileiro, eventually qualified for the Copa Libertadores. Fluminense had another chance to qualify for the Libertadores, the most prestigious club football tournament in South America, by finishing the Série A among the top four. Even though Fluminense managed to lead the table for a few rounds, it failed again in the last match. A draw against Palmeiras would have been enough for the team to finish fourth, but they lost.

In the beginning of 2006, Abel transferred to Internacional of Porto Alegre to lead the team in the football tournament of Rio Grande do Sul. Grêmio emerged champions and Abel was criticized as an eternal runner-up. However, he may claim to have changed that image by winning the Copa Libertadores, one of the greatest achievements in the history of Internacional. The IFFHS ranked him as the sixth best club coach in 2006. He also led Internacional to win the 2006 FIFA Club World Cup.

After a spell managing Al Jazira, where he won the league during his last year, he came back to Fluminense. The club was struggling after Muricy Ramalho was fired. Despite having little time to fix the team, which was in the lower positions of the Campeonato Brasileiro Série A when he took over, he managed to finish the year in third place and qualify for the Copa Libertadores. In 2012, he led Fluminense to win the Campeonato Brasileiro Série A and was awarded as the best coach of the league.

On 30 May 2013, after the elimination of Fluminense against Paraguayan Club Olimpia from 2013 Copa Libertadores, competition that Flu were one of favorites, Braga was humiliated by rival fans in the arrival of club. At same time, fans of the Tricolor wrote on the walls of Laranjeiras, headquarters of club, "Fora Abel" (Abel out) and "Time Sem Vergonha" (Team without shame).

On 29 July 2013, after five consecutive loses in 2013 Brazilian League, that keep the club in relegation zone, Braga was dismissed from Fluminense.

In January 2014, Braga returned to Internacional as manager. On 15 December, he announced that he would not continue as manager of Internacional.

Braga returned to Al Jazira for a second spell in the summer of 2015, but parted company with the club in December after a string of poor results.

Fluminense hired Braga on 1 December 2016, to be the head coach for the 2017 season. Fluminense had a decent performance in the first semester of 2017, when Fluminense became champions of Primeira Liga, runner-ups to 2017 Campeonato Carioca, but failed to advance through the round of 16 in 2017 Copa do Brasil. There was speculation of his retirement after his son João Pedro died in midseason. Fluminense ended 2017 Campeonato Brasileiro in 14th position and reached the round of 8 in 2017 Copa Sudamericana.

Abel Braga continued as Fluminense head coach for 2018. Fluminense had early exits in every tournament played in 2018. Before the Brazilian midseason break for the 2018 FIFA World Cup, Abel resigned after a 18 month stint. Abel is currently the record holder for the 2nd most matches as a Fluminense head coach.

On 2 January 2019, Flamengo hired Abel Braga as head coach. They confirmed their status as favourites by winning the 2019 Campeonato Carioca. He resigned on 29 May after being contested by fans.

Cruzeiro announced Braga as head coach on 27 September 2019, but sacked him on 29 November after winning three games out of 14. He was announced as Vasco da Gama's head coach for the 2020 season on 16 December 2019, but resigned the following 16 March.

On 10 November 2020, Braga returned to Internacional for a seventh spell as manager, replacing Eduardo Coudet. He left the following 26 February, after losing the 2020 Série A in the last round.

In June 2021, Braga was hired by Swiss Super League club FC Lugano, but was sacked on 1 September after the team gained 2 points in the first 4 league games of the 2021–22 season. On 15 December, he returned to Fluminense for a fourth spell as manager, but resigned on 28 April 2022, despite winning the 2022 Campeonato Carioca.

Personal life
On 29 July 2017, Braga's 18-year-old son, João Pedro, died after falling from the balcony of the family's apartment in the Leblon region of Rio de Janeiro. Braga was informed of his son's death whilst undergoing the final preparations for Fluminense's fixture against Ponte Preta the following day. Ponte Preta agreed to Fluminense's request to postpone the match, which was rescheduled by the CBF.

Managerial statistics

Honours

Player
Fluminense
Campeonato Carioca: 1971, 1973 and 1975

Vasco
Campeonato Carioca: 1977

Manager
Atlético Paranaense
Campeonato Paranaense: 1998

Coritiba
Campeonato Paranaense: 1999

Vasco
Taça Guanabara: 2000

Flamengo
Campeonato Carioca: 2004, 2019
Taça Guanabara: 2004
Taça Rio: 2019

Fluminense
Campeonato Carioca: 2005, 2012, 2022
Taça Rio: 2005, 2018
Taça Guanabara: 2012, 2017, 2022
Campeonato Brasileiro Série A: 2012
Primeira Liga: 2017

Internacional
Copa Libertadores: 2006
FIFA Club World Cup: 2006

Al Jazira
UAE League Cup: 2010
UAE Arabian Gulf League: 2010–11
UAE President's Cup: 2010–11

Individual
 Campeonato Carioca Manager of the year: 2017

References

External links

1952 births
Living people
Footballers from Rio de Janeiro (city)
Brazilian footballers
Footballers at the 1972 Summer Olympics
Olympic footballers of Brazil
1978 FIFA World Cup players
Brazil international footballers
Brazilian expatriate footballers
Expatriate footballers in France
Ligue 1 players
Campeonato Brasileiro Série A players
Brazilian football managers
Campeonato Brasileiro Série A managers
Ligue 1 managers
Fluminense FC players
CR Vasco da Gama players
Paris Saint-Germain F.C. players
Cruzeiro Esporte Clube players
Botafogo de Futebol e Regatas players
Goytacaz Futebol Clube players
Goytacaz Futebol Clube managers
Botafogo de Futebol e Regatas managers
Rio Ave F.C. managers
Esporte Clube Vitória managers
Galícia Esporte Clube managers
Santa Cruz Futebol Clube managers
Sport Club Internacional managers
C.F. Os Belenenses managers
Vitória F.C. managers
CR Vasco da Gama managers
Guarani FC managers
Club Athletico Paranaense managers
Coritiba Foot Ball Club managers
Olympique de Marseille managers
Clube Atlético Mineiro managers
Esporte Clube Bahia managers
Associação Atlética Ponte Preta managers
CR Flamengo managers
Fluminense FC managers
Al Jazira Club managers
Cruzeiro Esporte Clube managers
FC Lugano managers
Las Vegas Quicksilver players
North American Soccer League (1968–1984) players
Swiss Super League managers
Expatriate soccer players in the United States
Brazilian expatriate sportspeople in the United States
Brazilian expatriate sportspeople in France
Association football central defenders
Brazilian expatriate football managers
Brazilian expatriate sportspeople in Switzerland
Expatriate football managers in Switzerland